Hoàng Thị Hoà (born 6 June 1951) is a Vietnamese swimmer. She competed in the women's 200 metre breaststroke at the 1980 Summer Olympics.

References

External links
 

1951 births
Living people
Vietnamese female breaststroke swimmers
Olympic swimmers of Vietnam
Swimmers at the 1980 Summer Olympics
Place of birth missing (living people)
21st-century Vietnamese women